Darevskia brauneri,  Brauner's rock lizard, is a lizard species in the genus Darevskia. It is found in Georgia and Russia.

References

Darevskia
Reptiles described in 1909
Taxa named by Lajos Méhelÿ
Reptiles of Russia